Silver Flag training exercise provides United States Air Force Civil Engineers with a training venue in a contingency environment that focuses on hands-on technical experience for high-demand, contingency tools and equipment generally not available at home station. Standardized curriculum is managed through the Air Force Civil Engineer Center (AFCEC). 

Silver Flag training exercise focuses on bare base beddown, sustainment operations and recovery after attack. The following elements are part of the training covered during Silver Flag:
 Base Expeditionary Airfield Resources (BEAR), Reverse Osmosis Water Purification Unit (ROWPU), Mobile Aircraft Arresting System (MAAS), Emergency Airfield Lighting System (EALS) and High voltage power generation and distribution systems.
 Airfield Damage Repair (ADR).
 Firefighting, CBRN Management/Response and Explosive Ordnance Disposal (EOD). 
Silver Flag is available at three USAF training sites:
 Detachment 1, 823rd RED HORSE Squadron, Tyndall Air Force Base, USA
 554th RED HORSE Squadron, Andersen Air Force Base, Guam
 435th Construction and Training Squadron, Ramstein Air Base, Germany

External links
Silver Flag exercise hones airmen’s skills for all phases of deployment
U.S., Canadian CEs train at Silver Flag
Exercise Silver Flag at Tyndall Air Force Base, Florida
Silver Flag Site, Tyndall AFB

United States Air Force exercises